Robert Lewis Reid (July 29, 1862 – December 2, 1929) was an American Impressionist painter and muralist. His work tended to be very decorative, much of it centered on depiction of young women set among flowers. He later became known for his murals and designs in stained glass.

Life and work
Robert Reid was born in Stockbridge, Massachusetts and attended the School of the Museum of Fine Arts, Boston under Otto Grundmann, where he was later an instructor.  In 1884 he moved to New York City, studying at the Art Students League, and in 1885 he went to Paris to study at the Académie Julian under Gustave Boulanger and Jules Joseph Lefebvre. His early pictures were figures of French peasants, painted at Étaples.

Upon returning to New York in 1889, he worked as a portraitist and later became an instructor at the Art Students League and Cooper Union.

Paintings
He painted three murals for the Manufactures Building at the 1893 World's Columbian Exposition in Chicago, and exhibited four paintings in its Fine Arts Building. His work, including the tragic Her First Born (1888), was awarded a medal for excellence.

Reid was a member of the Ten American Painters, who seceded from the Society of American Artists in 1897. His painting Dawn was awarded the 1898 First Hallgarten Prize by the National Academy of Design.

Reid worked on several mural projects around the turn of the century. When he returned to paintings, around 1905, his work was more naturalistic, and his palette tended toward soft pastels.

Murals
Reid's murals are in the Library of Congress in Washington, D.C., and the Appellate Court House in New York City. The Rotunda of the Massachusetts State House in Boston contains his three large mural panels—James Otis Delivering his Speech against the Writs of Assistance, Paul Revere's Ride, and The Boston Tea Party. He executed a mural panel for the American Pavilion at the 1900 Exposition Universelle in Paris.

His murals for the Palace of Fine Arts building at the Panama–Pacific International Exposition (San Francisco, 1915) were an extraordinary tribute to the Arts.
Eight huge panels graced the ceiling of the rotunda: The Four Golds of California (Golden Metal, Wheat, Citrus Fruits, and Poppies); 
plus Ideals in Art, Inspirations of All Arts, the Birth of European Art and Birth of Oriental Art. These paintings no longer exist in San Francisco's Palace of Fine Arts, which was re-built in the 1960s, and their current whereabouts are unknown.

Stained glass
In 1906 Reid completed a series of ten stained glass windows depicting the Life of Christ for the Unitarian Memorial Church in Fairhaven, Massachusetts. For the Church of St. Paul the Apostle in New York City, he created The Martyrdom of St. Paul Window, located at the southwestern end of the nave.

U.S. Navy Recruiting Poster 
"Chicagoans knew Reid as the artist who painted a mammoth Navy recruiting poster that embellished the billboard at the northern terminus of Michigan Avenue for several months" (before 1918).

Honors
The National Academy of Design elected Reid an Associate member in 1904, and an Academician in 1906.

Personal

Reid also taught Nan Sheets.

Reid died in Clifton Springs, New York.

Bibliography

Annotations

Notes

References linked to inline notes 

  ; .

  ; ; ; .

  ; .
<li> 

  ; ; .

   (article).

Other references 

  .
Exhibited paintings:

<li> Anatol
<li> Vivian
<li> Phryne
<li> Silvie
<li> Hebe
<li> Chloe
<li> Bettine
<li> Daphne
<li> Beulah
<li> 
<li> Laleen
<li> Laleet
<li> Mildred

People from Stockbridge, Massachusetts
1862 births
1929 deaths
19th-century American painters
19th-century American male artists
American male painters
20th-century American painters
20th-century American male artists
American Impressionist painters
American muralists
Académie Julian alumni
Painters from Massachusetts
American stained glass artists and manufacturers